Beautiful Life, also known as Beautiful Life: A Slight Miscalculation, is the third solo studio album by Martha Davis, who is better known as the lead singer for the band The Motels.  The 2008 album is a concept album Martha developed with some help from Matthew Morgan about her mother's life and death by suicide.

Track listing
"Watching the World Go By" – 4:05
"Beautiful Life" – 2:57
"Interlude #1" – 1:21
"Let Me Fall" – 3:59
"Life Alone" – 4:03
"Deep End" – 2:59
"The Rain" – 4:40
"I Will Breathe" – 3:43
"Interlude #2" – 2:04
"When It's Over" – 3:21
"4:30 Friday" – 4:37
"Outro" – 1:15

Personnel

The Motels
Martha Davis – vocals, guitar 
Clint Walsh – guitars, vocals, synthesizer
Jon Siebels – bass guitar
Nick Johns – keyboard
Eric Gardner – drums, percussion

Production
Produced by Martha Davis
Mixed by Jon Siebels
Mastered by Mark Chalecki

References

2008 albums
Martha Davis (rock singer) albums